Meir is a suburb in Stoke-on-Trent, Staffordshire situated between Lightwood and Longton. Meir Park estate extends from Meir uphill to the Meir Heath and Rough Close village hall,  located in Meir Heath.

Meir Aerodrome
Meir Aerodrome closed in the early 1970s and the site has now become the Meir Park housing estate. The earlier parts have mainly aviation-associated street names. The last official flight was on 16 August 1973 when Fred Holdcroft flew a Piper Tri-Pacer carrying a Sentinel journalist to Manchester. The last unofficial flight "a year or two" later by Eric Clutton was in a home-made folding machine called FRED (Flying Runabout Experimental Design) which the pilot towed home behind his car. The light planes used to be parked on the grass alongside the A50 road, opposite the Airport Garage, which remains. Staffordshire Potteries had a factory (now demolished) beside the aerodrome.

Schools
 Abbey Hill School
 Crescent Primary School
 Meir Heath Primary School
 Ormiston Meridian Academy
 St Augustine's R.C. Primary School
 Sandon Primary Academy

Transport

Meir is situated along the A50. At the centre sits the junction with the A520. Once a notorious traffic jam site, a tunnel was built in 1997 to take the A50 underneath. The twin tunnels were walled with ceramic panels which were reported to have cost about £1,000 each when they began to come loose through rusting of their attachments after a few years.

Meir was served by a railway station from 1894 to 1966.

Nearest places
 Barlaston
 Blythe Bridge
 Lightwood
 Longton
 Trentham

References

Areas of Stoke-on-Trent